The Calm is a film by Polish director Krzysztof Kieślowski made in 1976 but not exhibited until broadcast on Polish television in 1980. It starred Jerzy Stuhr, Izabella Olszewska, and Jerzy Trela. Based on a story by Lech Borski and a screenplay by Kieślowski and Jerzy Stuhr, the film is about a young man who leaves prison after a three-year sentence seeking to start a new life. His dreams of a better life are broken, however, when he is forced into a conflict between a corrupt construction company boss and his fellow workers who go on strike. The Calm was filmed on location in Kraków and completed in 1976, but was banned by the state because of its subject matter—strikes were illegal in Poland during that time. The film was finally shown on Polish television for the first time on 19 September 1980. In 1981, The Calm received the Polish Film Festival Special Jury Prize.

Plot
A young man in Poland, Antek Gralak (Jerzy Stuhr), is released from prison after serving a three-year sentence. Leaving his home town of Kraków, Antek heads for a construction site in Silesia where he is not known. He dreams of living a simple life, with a job, a wife, and home. In Silesia he is anxious to avoid trouble and is friendly with his colleagues and grateful to his employer for hiring him. 

Antek meets a nice young woman, falls in love, and gets married. His joyful new life is soon interrupted, however, when he becomes involved in a conflict at work. Construction materials have disappeared and Antek's boss, who is involved in the theft, deducts the loss from the workers' wages. Thinking he can trust Antek, the boss tries to get him involved in his underhanded deals. 

Soon a strike breaks out among the workers. Torn between his boss and his coworkers, Antek, who is only interested in finding peace, shows up for work. Believing Antek to be in league with their corrupt boss, the striking workers beat him up as he mutters, "Calm ... calm ..."

Cast
 Jerzy Stuhr as Antek Gralak
 Izabella Olszewska
 Jerzy Trela
 Jan Adamski
 Marian Cebulski
 Edward Dobrzanski
 Ryszard Dreger
 Jerzy Fedorowicz
 Stanislaw Gronkowski
 Elzbieta Karkoszka
 Stanislaw Marczewski
 Stefan Mienicki
 Jan Nizinski
 Ryszard Palik
 Danuta Ruksza
 Janusz Sykutera
 Feliks Szajnert
 Michal Szulkiewicz
 Grzegorz Warchol
 Ferdynand Wójcik
 Michal Zarnecki

Reception

Awards and nominations
 1981 Polish Film Festival Special Jury Prize (Krzysztof Kieslowski) Won

References
Notes

Citations

Bibliography

External links
 

1980 films
Films directed by Krzysztof Kieślowski
Polish drama films
Films with screenplays by Krzysztof Kieślowski
1980s Polish-language films